Bookshelf Symbol 7 is a typeface which was packaged with Microsoft Office 2003.  It is a pi font encoding several less common variants of Roman letters, including a small subset of those used in the International Phonetic Alphabet, a few musical symbols and mathematical symbols, a few additional symbols (including torii) and a few rare or obscure kanji.

In 2004, Microsoft released a critical update (Knowledge Base Article 833407) to remove two swastikas (one diagonal, one straight) and a Star of David from this typeface, shown in the chart below as 0x7E (not displayed for lack of Unicode character), 0x86, and 0x74 respectively, presumably after complaints from users who took the swastikas as support for Nazism.

Encoding

References

External links
 Description of the Bookshelf Symbol 7 Font Removal Tool in Office 2003
 An Open Letter from Senior Vice President Steven Sinofsky
 The first 113 symbols.
 The Handbook 

Symbol typefaces
Typefaces and fonts introduced in 2003